Kommunizm were a Soviet-Russian conceptual collective from Omsk. The band was formed in 1988 and broke up in 1990. 

The band released fourteen albums during their original run, including four-part compilation in 1996. Some of the albums were reissued on CD in 2000–2003 through the label HOR, and in 2007 some were remastered and reissued with bonus tracks by Misteriya Zvuka. Two albums were reissued on vinyl with bonus tracks in 2011 by Neuro Empire's Stanzmarke imprint.

Konstantin Ryabinov died on 16 March 2020 at the age of 55. On 19 February 2021, Sudakov stated that Kommunizm had recorded a fifteenth album in 2019, which was intended to be the group's final album, but Ryabinov's death prevented it from being finished. He announced the new album's release for that summer.

Discography 
Na sovetskoy skorosti (1988)
Suleyman Stalsky (1988)
Veselyashchiy gaz (1989)
Rodina slyshit (1989)
Soldatskiy son (1989)
Chudo-muzyka (1989)
Narodovedenie (1989)
Satanizm (1989)
Zhizn chto skazka (1989)
Let It Be (1989)
Igra v samoletiki pod krovatyu (1989)
Leniniana (1989)
Trinadtsat (1990)
Khronika pikiruyushchego bombardirovshchika (1990)
Blagodat (2015)
A series of albums was also released in 1996 titled Blagodat, bearing no relation to the 2015 releases other than the name and similar cover artwork.
Granitsa schastia (2021)

References

External links 

Russian musical groups
Soviet musical groups
Musical groups established in 1988
Musical groups disestablished in 1990
Musical groups reestablished in 2010
Musical groups disestablished in 2018

Russian rock music groups